MOSS may refer to:

Technology
 Map Overlay and Statistical System, a geographic information system (GIS)
 Microsoft SharePoint, known in its 2007 version as Microsoft Office SharePoint Server (MOSS)
 MIME Object Security Services, an IETF security protocol
 Mobile submarine simulator, a sonar decoy
 Morocco Oukaimeden Sky Survey, an astronomical survey of Solar System objects in Morocco

Other uses
 Market Oriented Sector Selective talks, trade negotiations between the United States and Japan in 1984
 MOSS (company), a Japanese video game company
 MoSS, a Canadian hip-hop producer
 Mini One Stop Shop, the European Union VAT system for cross-border B2C e-services.
 Mobile submarine simulator, Mark 70 sonar decoy previously used by US Navy submarines

See also
 Moss (disambiguation)
 MOS (disambiguation)